Sally Shaw (born 19 September 1978) is a former Australian cricketer. A right-handed opening batter, she played two List A matches for New South Wales during the 2000–01 season of the Women's National Cricket League (WNCL).

References

External links
 
 

1978 births
Living people
Australian cricketers
Australian women cricketers
Cricketers from New South Wales
Sportswomen from New South Wales
New South Wales Breakers cricketers
People from Goulburn